The Prep League is a high school athletic league that is part of the CIF Southern Section.

Members
 Chadwick School
 Flintridge Preparatory School
 Mayfield Senior School (girls school)
 Polytechnic School (except football)
 Providence High School
 Rio Hondo Preparatory School (except football)
 Sage Hill School (football only)
 Windward School (football only)
 Westridge School (girls school)

References

CIF Southern Section leagues